North Carolina Agricultural and Technical State University is host to 17 national fraternity and sorority chapters. The Greek system at North Carolina A&T is very selective, with roughly 1.4% of undergraduate male students and 1.2% of undergraduate female students involved in fraternities and sororities.

Fraternities and sororities at N.C. A&T provide both social and service opportunities for students. As of 2013, the Office of Greek Life recognizes nine fraternities and seven sororities that vary in scope from, social, service, honorary, and social fellowships that do not affiliate themselves with the traditional black Greek movement.

Greek System
The Greek system at North Carolina A&T is considered very selective with roughly 1.4% of undergraduate male students and 1.2% of undergraduate female students involved in fraternities and sororities. As of 2013, the Office of Greek Life recognized Nine Fraternities and Seven Sororities. Active fraternities at NC A&T include Alpha Phi Omega, a national co-ed community service fraternity; Kappa Kappa Psi, a national honorary Band fraternity; and Pershing Rifles, is a military fraternal organization for college-level students: and social fraternities Alpha Phi Alpha, Kappa Alpha Psi, Omega Psi Phi, Phi Beta Sigma, Iota Phi Theta, Lambda Chi Alpha, Phi Mu Alpha Sinfonia, a collegiate social fraternity for men with a special interest in music; and social fellowship Groove Phi Groove. Active sororities at the university include Chi Eta Phi, a professional association for registered professional & student nurses; Tau Beta Sigma, a national honorary band sorority; and social sororities Alpha Kappa Alpha; Delta Sigma Theta; Zeta Phi Beta; Sigma Gamma Rho; and social fellowship Swing Phi Swing.

Fraternities and Sororities at N.C. A&T are governed by either the National Pan-Hellenic Council (NPHC) or the Greek Lettered Council. The National Pan-Hellenic Council, collectively known as the "Divine Nine," is a collaborative organization of nine historically African American, international Greek lettered fraternities and sororities. The Greek Lettered Council serves as a governing body for the non-NPHC organizations and social fellowships.

Chapters

National Pan-Hellenic Council

Greek Lettered Council
Other National fraternities and sororities with registered chapters are members of the Greek Lettered Council. The current members on campus include:

Social fellowships

National Social Fellowships that do not affiliate with Greek Lettered organizations fall under the jurisdiction of 'Social Fellowships. The Current Members on campus Include:

References

North Carolina A&T State University
North Carolina Agricultural and Technical State University